Pitușca is a village in Călărași District, Moldova.

Notable people
 Vladimir Plahotniuc

References

Villages of Călărași District